Bristol-Plymouth Regional Technical School is a vocational high school located in Taunton, Massachusetts, United States, that has been in operation since September 1972. Bristol-Plymouth is one of the three high schools in the city of Taunton, and enrolls roughly 1,200 students in grades 9 through 12. The school draws students from the towns and cities of Bridgewater, Raynham, Berkley, Taunton, Rehoboth, Middleboro, and Dighton. Because it is considered to be its own school district, it has an on-site superintendent as well as a principal and vice principal.

The school colors are dark blue, light blue and silver. The athletic teams are known as the Craftsmen and the mascot is called "Crafty".

In 2017 the Bristol-Plymouth Football team came in first place in the Mayflower Athletic Conference.

Academics
Bristol-Plymouth offers students courses in mathematics, English, physical and life sciences, social studies, Spanish, health, and physical education. The classes are for the most part divided into three learning tiers: Standard, Advanced, and Honors or AP (depending on the course and grade level). 
The school's Advanced Placement (AP) courses consists of Biology and U.S History for Sophomores, English Literature for Juniors, and Calculus AB and English Language for Seniors. The school also offers numerous trade-specific AP classes: the Biotechnology program offers AP Statistics, and the Computer Networking Technology program offers AP Computer Science Principles, both courses for Juniors.

Technical programs
Bristol-Plymouth has nineteen technical programs:
 Automotive Technology
 Biotechnology
 Business and Applied Technology (formerly Computer Information Technology)
 CAD/CAM (formerly two separate technical programs)
 Carpentry
 Collision Technology
 Community Health
 Computer and Networking Technology (CNT)
 Cosmetology
 Culinary Arts (formerly Food Trades)
 Dental Assisting
 Design and Visual Communications (DVC)
 Early Childhood Education
 Electrical Technology
 Graphic Design
 Heating, Ventilation and Air Conditioning (HVAC)
 Metal Fabrication
 Plumbing
 Robotics & Engineering Technology

Students in the technical programs receive a hands-on learning experience. They receive practical training through outside jobs provided by the program. On-site Bristol-Plymouth has a hair salon, restaurant, daycare/preschool, computer service desk and car shop where students provide services to paying customers. In addition, many off-site shops operate within the community to provide additional services with "real-world" applications.

The school operates on an "A" and "B" week schedule; 9th and 11th graders are in the shop when the 10th and 12th graders are in academic classrooms, and vice versa.

In their junior and senior years, students have the opportunity to participate in a program known as CO-OP. Instead of attending traditional classes during the week of technical instruction, CO-OP students are allowed to work paid positions with local businesses related to their particular field of study.

Demographics

According to the Massachusetts Department of Elementary and Secondary Education, there were 1,322 students enrolled for the 2014–2015 school year. 1,153 students (87.2%) were listed as White, 73 students (5.5%) as Hispanic, 44 students (3.3%) as African-American, 8 students (0.6%) as Asian, 7 students (0.5%) as Native American, and 37 students (2.8%) as multi-racial. 57.5% of the students were male, with 42.5% female.

In the 2013–2014 school year, there were 1281 students enrolled. Of these students, 1,131 students (88.3%) were listed as White, 64 students (5%) as Hispanic, 45 students (3.5%) as African-American, 5 students (0.4%) as Asian, and 31 students (2.4%) as multi-racial. 58.1% of students were male and 41.9% were female. Of all enrolled students, 6 were considered to be English Language Learners (ELL).

Based on data from the National Center for Education Statistics, in the 2012–2013 school year, there were 1,275 students enrolled. Of these students, 1,114 students (87.4%) were listed as White, 64 students (5%) as Hispanic, 53 students (4.2%) as Black, 5 students (0.4%) as Asian/Pacific Islander, 5 students (0.4%) as American Indian/Alaskan Native, and 34 students (2.7%) as multi-racial. 708 students (55.5%) were male and 567 students (44.5%) were female. In this school year, the student to teacher ratio was 13.44.

References

External links
Official website

Public high schools in Massachusetts
Schools in Bristol County, Massachusetts
1972 establishments in Massachusetts